Gary Joseph Gaetti (born August 19, 1958), is an American former third baseman in Major League Baseball for the Minnesota Twins (1981–1990), California Angels (1991–1993), Kansas City Royals (1993–1995), St. Louis Cardinals (1996–1998), Chicago Cubs (1998–1999) and Boston Red Sox (2000).

Gaetti won a World Series with Minnesota in 1987 and was the MVP of that year's American League Championship Series against the Detroit Tigers. In 1987, Gaetti became the first player ever to hit home runs in his first two postseason plate appearances. Gaetti also managed the independent league Sugar Land Skeeters from 2012-2017.

Playing career
Gaetti played collegiate baseball for Lake Land College in Mattoon, Illinois, and Northwest Missouri State University. Gaetti was drafted three times before finally signing with the Twins — first by the St. Louis Cardinals in the fourth round of the 1978 Major League Baseball draft (then held annually in January) and again in 1978 by the Chicago White Sox in the third round of the June secondary draft before he was drafted by the Twins in the first round of the June secondary portion of the 1979 draft. Gaetti signed on June 21, 1979.

Gaetti then spent the next three years in the Twins' minor league system, playing for the rookie level Elizabethton Twins in the Appalachian League in 1979, the A-level Wisconsin Rapids Twins in the Midwest League in 1980, and the AA-level Orlando Twins in the Southern League in 1981. Gaetti then made his major league debut in nine September games and he hit a home run off of Charlie Hough in his first major league at-bat. In 1982, Gaetti would become a permanent fixture at third base for the Twins and would man third base in Minnesota for the next nine seasons.

In 1986, Gaetti batted .287 with 34 home runs and 108 runs batted in. Gaetti won four consecutive Gold Glove Awards for fielding excellence from 1986 through 1989. Gaetti helped propel the Twins to the  post-season and their first World Series championship, hitting .257 with 31 home runs and 109 RBI. He also hit himself into the record books, with home runs in his first two career postseason plate appearances in the American League Championship Series to help the Twins upset the Detroit Tigers.

Gaetti was selected as an All-Star in 1988 and 1989. Playing against the Boston Red Sox on July 17, 1990, Gaetti helped the Twins become the only team in baseball history to turn two triple plays in the same game. Despite their defensive heroics, the Twins lost the game 1–0.

His production continued to drop off with the Angels and midway through the third year of his four-year contract, he was released, in June . He was almost immediately signed by the Royals, who had lost their projected regular third baseman, Keith Miller, to injury and had been playing rookie Phil Hiatt at third. Gaetti hit 26 home runs for the Royals in 665 at-bats between 1993 and 1994, splitting time at third with Miller, David Howard, and Terry Shumpert. In , Gaetti played in 137 games and at the age of 36, he hit .261 with 35 home runs and 96 RBI, winning his only Silver Slugger, setting a career high in home runs and missing the Royals' team record for most home runs in a season by one.

Following the 1995 season, Gaetti signed as a free agent with the Cardinals, where he enjoyed two more productive seasons before being released again in August  after the Cardinals' acquisition of Fernando Tatís. Gaetti immediately signed with the Cubs, where he hit .320/8/27 as the Cubs won the National League wild card. The following season, Gaetti played only semi-regularly and was released at the end of the season after hitting .204 with nine home runs. He wound up his career the following season in Boston, appearing in five games in April  at the age of 41.

Bill James noted Gaetti's baseball-related aging process as being unusual for two reasons. Unlike most other league veterans, his walk rate never improved and his rate of productivity decline was "exceptionally" slow. Gaetti was used as an emergency relief pitcher by both the Cardinals and the Cubs, retiring with an ERA of 7.71 and one strikeout in three appearances.

Gaetti finished in the top 25 voting for American League Most Valuable Player four times in his career, three times with the Minnesota Twins (1986–1988), and once with the Kansas City Royals (1995). He finished fifth in American League Rookie of the Year voting (1982). He was a four-time Golden Glove Award winner (1986-1989). His 2,280 total base hits rank him 159th in the history of Major League Baseball.

Retirement
Gaetti was inducted into the NWMSU athletic hall of fame, the "M-Club", in October 2003. He coached in the Houston Astros minor league system as a hitting coach with the AAA New Orleans Zephyrs from 2002 to 2004. Gaetti was promoted to hitting coach for the Astros on July 14, 2004, when the team dismissed manager Jimy Williams, hitting coach Harry Spilman, and pitching coach Burt Hooton. Gaetti remained in this position until July 12, when he was fired by the Astros. Following the season, he was hired as the hitting coach for Tampa Bay's AAA affiliate, the Durham Bulls — a position he would hold through the 2008 season. After working at Baseball USA in Houston, Texas in 2011, Gaetti was named the first manager of the Sugar Land Skeeters. The independent team began play in 2012. During his six seasons as manager, he led them to a 448-391 overall record. In 2013, his team set the ALPB record in games won (95) and winning percentage (.679) in a season. He took them to two championship series (2014 and 2016) winning Sugar Land's first championship in 2016. The Skeeters retired his number on August 21, 2021.

On August 19, Gaetti's 49th birthday, the Minnesota Twins inducted him into the team's Hall of Fame, while the club simultaneously released a commemorative bobblehead in his honor.

Gaetti's son Joe played collegiate baseball for North Carolina State and played in the minor leagues in five different farm systems, including two separate stints with the Twins AA-level club, the New Britain Rock Cats. After failing to advance beyond the AAA level in the minor leagues, Joe ended his career in 2010 playing for the Lancaster Barnstormers of the independent Atlantic League.

Personal life
Gaetti became a born-again Christian while recovering from season-ending knee surgery he underwent late in the 1988 season.

In 2020, Gaetti opened the Gaetti Sports Academy to support practice and instruction for softball and baseball for area youth.

See also

 List of Major League Baseball career home run leaders
 List of Major League Baseball career hits leaders
 List of Major League Baseball career doubles leaders
 List of Major League Baseball career runs scored leaders
 List of Major League Baseball career runs batted in leaders
 List of Major League Baseball players with a home run in their first major league at bat

References

External links

GaryGaetti.com

1958 births
Living people
American people of Italian descent
Baseball coaches from Illinois
American League All-Stars
American League Championship Series MVPs
Baseball players from Illinois
Boston Red Sox players
California Angels players
Chicago Cubs players
Elizabethton Twins players
Gold Glove Award winners
Houston Astros coaches
Lake Land Lakers baseball players
Kansas City Royals players
Major League Baseball hitting coaches
Major League Baseball third basemen
Minnesota Twins players
Minor league baseball managers
Northwest Missouri State Bearcats baseball players
Orlando Twins players
People from Centralia, Illinois
Silver Slugger Award winners
St. Louis Cardinals players
Wisconsin Rapids Twins players
American evangelicals